Olfen is a town in the district of Coesfeld, in North Rhine-Westphalia, Germany.

History
Bishop Wolfhelm, who originated from the Ulfloa Oberhof, gave the small town its name in 889. Wolfhelm was the fourth bishop of "Mimingardeford", today called Münster.

The fire disaster of 1857, in which 142 houses were destroyed, has gone down as the "Great Fire of Olfen" in Olfen's history books.

Buildings
Interesting sights include St. Vitus church, a castle and a historic sawmill.

Politics
Wilhelm Sendermann (CDU) was elected for mayor in September 2015 with 87.4% of the vote. He was re-elected in 2020.

Notable people 
 Thomas Hoof (born 1948), founder of Manufactum
 Günter Schlierkamp (born 1970), professional bodybuilder

Town partnerships
  La Grange, United States

References

Coesfeld (district)